Privatier ([], also spelled Privatus, with the feminine forms Privata or Privatière, meaning "private person") is a French word that was used from the 19th century in Germany and some other countries as a title by members of bourgeois families of substantial financial means in lieu of another professional title. Much like rentier, it denotes someone who does not have to work to make a living, and who lives off their assets of some size, e.g. interest, profits from investments, real estate and current assets. Sometimes, the title is used by affluent businessmen after they have wholly or largely retired from their former activity. For example, in Thomas Mann's novel Buddenbrooks, the character Alois Permaneder, a former merchant, uses this title after his marriage to Tony Buddenbrook after receiving a substantial dowry from her wealthy family, at which point he retires from business.

References

French words and phrases
German words and phrases
Business occupations
Social class in Germany
Social history
Social groups